Rookada Panchi (: Little Miss Puppet) is a 2020 Sri Lankan Sinhala children's musical drama film co–directed and co-produced by two brothers Kalpana Ariyawansa and Vindana Ariyawansa with their father Kularatne Ariyawansa as executive producer for East West Entertainment. It stars child artist Kushenya Fonseka in lead role with Jackson Anthony, Dilhani Ekanayake and Dhananjaya Siriwardena in supportive roles. Music composed by Dr. Rohana Weerasinghe. Kushenya is the daughter of Asanga Fonseka, the son of Malini Fonseka's younger brother Ananda Fonseka.

The official trailer was released on 20 February 2020. The premiere was held on the 23 September 2020 at the Savoy Primiere Cinema. Initially planned to be released on 17 September, it was delayed and was officially released on 24 September 2020. On 8 September 2020, the songs of the film composed by Rohana Weerasinghe was released at 4 pm at the Savoy Premier Hall, Wellawatte.

The film received mostly positive reviews from critics.

Plot

Cast
 Kushenya Fonseka as Rangi 
 Lakshika Deshan as Sasa
 Jackson Anthony as Uncle Louis
 Dilhani Ekanayake as Rangi's mother 
 Dhananjaya Siriwardena as Uncle
 Umali Thilakarathne as Punchi
 Dayadeva Edirisinghe as Walter
 Bandula Wijeweera
 Niroshan Wijesinghe as Rangi's father
 Malani Fonseka as School principal
 Ravindra Randeniya in cameo appearance
 Bandula Nanayakkarawasam in cameo appearance

References

External links
 
 Official trailer
 Official Facebook page
 මාරු වුණාම කොහොමද?
 අරුණ සිනමා
 ආරියවංශ දෙසොහොයුරන් “රූකඩ පැංචි” ගෙනඑයි
 රූකඩ පැංචි සඳහා සිනමාවේ යෝධයන් දෙපොළක් එක්වේ
 කොවිඩ් තිබුණත් රූකඩ පැංචි හා මිස් ජෙනිස් දිගටම

2020s Sinhala-language films
2020 films
Sri Lankan drama films